The Battle of Cornul lui Sas took place on 9 July 1612 between the forces of Ștefan IX Tomșa, the ruler of Moldavia, (supported by the Ottoman Empire) and the Budjak Horde led by Khan Temir (spelled Cantemir-bey by Romanian chroniclers)), and a private army assembled by Stefan Potocki, voivode of Bratslav in the (Polish–Lithuanian Commonwealth in order to reinstall his brother in low Constantin Movilă as Moldavian ruler. By tacking this stance, Potocki openly defied the king's order to avoid any conflict with Ottomans. The battle resulted in a clear defeat of the Potocki's army. Both Stefan Potocki and Constantin Movilǎ's mother, Elisabeta Movilǎ were captured by Ottomans.

The former voivode of Moldavia Constantin Movilă was taken prisoner by the Tatars, with the intent to ransom him, but he drowned while they were crossing the Dniester.

This battle was an episode of Moldavian Magnate Wars.

This battle forms the topic of the first chapter in Mihail Sadoveanu's historical novel Neamul Şoimăreştilor (The Falconers' Strain).

References

Cornul lui Sas
Cornul lui Sas
Cornul lui Sas
Cornul lui Sas
Cornul lui Sas
Military history of Romania
History of Western Moldavia
History of Iași County
1612 in Europe
1612 in the Ottoman Empire
17th century in Moldavia